The Flaming Geyser State Park is located on the Green River in southwestern King County, Washington, near the city of Black Diamond. When the pocket was discovered by prospective coal miners in the early 1900s, the test hole hit gas and saltwater, shooting water and flames  into the air. The same methane pocket seeps gas through a mud hole to create the "Bubbling Geyser" nearby. Both "geysers" can be found along a short hike, though as of 2016 the flaming geyser is no longer lit due to depletion of its methane source.

Despite these unique features, the most popular park use is for summer tubing and rafting in the river.  Flaming Geyser also has a specially designated area for flying remote-controlled model airplanes.

History
Flaming Geyser was operated privately from the 1920s until the 1960s when the park fell into bankruptcy.  When the land risked takeover by home development, Washington State Parks purchased the land and has managed it since.  Urban legend of the park's history describes how miner Eugene Lawson aimed to profit from the ignited methane emission.  While Lawson is a real historical figure who owned the Lawson Mine between 1895 and 1898 prior to two fatal explosions in 1902 and 1910, there is little record of involvement with Flaming Geyser.

Park management
The Park is managed by Washington State Parks and Recreation Commission as a part of the Green River Gorge State Park Conservation Area. The area also includes Black Diamond Heritage Area, Old Town of Franklin Heritage Area, Hanging Gardens Recreation Area, Walter 
A. Jellum Recreation Area, and Nolte State Park.

Natural resources
The area is known for its coal and cinnabar mines, with approximately 14% of Washington's coal coming from the Black Diamond vicinity.

The Green River is a popular steelheading location in the winter, and an ADA-accessible Salmon Interpretative Trail in the park explains more about this ecological relationship.

References

External links
Flaming Geyser State Park Washington State Parks and Recreation Commission
Flaming Geyser State Park Map Washington State Parks and Recreation Commission

Parks in King County, Washington
State parks of Washington (state)
Persistent natural fires